Bowyangs are pieces of cord, rope or leather that are tied around the wearer's lower legs. A "bowyang" is a single piece of the tie. Bowyangs come in several varieties:

 A thong or string used to hold trousers legs up, so that the wearer can squat or bend often without dragging the waist-belt down to the point where the trousers fall off. The thong or string is tied above the calf muscle of the lower leg, just below the knees, and in such a way as to hold a suitable amount of the upper leg of the trouser above the knee.  A second purpose is to stop dust, grass seeds, insects and snakes going up the legs of farm workers. There is also the thought that in days gone by when farm workers only bathed once a week the bowyangs kept the dust and dirt from going up the legs and so helped keep the wearer clean.
These devices are commonly used in Australia and New Zealand by agricultural workers and those who frequently work in a stooped position. They are a particular feature of the dress of a shearer and used, nowadays, worldwide by them. The statue of a ploughman and his plough on the war memorial on North Terrace, Adelaide, South Australia has a man wearing bowyangs.

In England, bowyangs (but not by that name - in Norfolk they were called Elijahs) were an integral feature of “gorblimey trousers”, baggy corduroy trousers worn by e.g. coalmen and dustmen as featured in the song “My Old Man’s a Dustman” by Lonnie Donegan.
In some parts of Scotland they were known as “Nicky-tams”, and is the subject of a traditional Bothy Ballad of the same name.

Cloth cones that are tied or held by elastic over the pants leg just above the ankle, and extend down to cover the top of the shoe or boot. This is to stop dirt, cement or brick powder, or any other matter getting inside the sock or footwear via the top or shoelace holes. They are commonly employed on Australian building sites, and are sold commercially for this purpose.

Straps that pilots, and other flight-crew, wear just below the knee that connects to their ejection-seat mechanism in such a way that the seat's ejection stroke hauls both legs back against the seat (to clear the instrument panel above) and restrains them from flailing about in the slipstream before the seat is slowed and steadied. The attachment is released as the pilot is released from the seat during its automatic sequencing. This colloquial use of "bowyangs" was started in the Royal New Zealand Air Force and spread, via the seat-manufacturer, to other air forces.

References
Macquarie Dictionary Fourth Edition
Martin-Baker

Australian clothing
Australian fashion
Safety clothing